Hemicycliophora arenaria is a plant pathogenic nematode.

See also 
 List of Capsicum diseases
 List of citrus diseases

References

External links 
 Nemaplex, University of California - Hemicycliophora arenaria

Tylenchida
Citrus pests
Agricultural pest nematodes